"God Speaking" is the second single from Mandisa's album, True Beauty. It was released to Christian radio on October 22, 2007. It was written by Ronnie Freeman, who also recorded it as the title track for his second album.

Charts

References

2007 singles
Mandisa songs
Sparrow Records singles
2007 songs
Songs written by Ronnie Freeman
Christian songs
Religious music